Several polling firms conducted opinion polls during the term of the 52nd New Zealand Parliament in the lead up to the 2020 general election, which elects the 53rd Parliament. The 52nd Parliament was elected on 23 September 2017 and dissolved on 6 September 2020. The 2020 election was originally due to take place on Saturday 19 September 2020, but due to a second COVID-19 outbreak it was delayed until Saturday 17 October 2020.

Very few polls have been conducted compared to previous electoral cycles. The two regular polls are Television New Zealand (1 News), conducted by Colmar Brunton, and MediaWorks New Zealand (Newshub) Reid Research, with less frequent polls from Roy Morgan Research. The sample size, margin of error and confidence interval of each poll varies by organisation and date.

Party vote

Graphical summary
The first graph shows trend lines averaged across all polls for all political parties that are routinely included by polling companies. The second graph shows parties that received less than 10% of the party vote in the 2017 election, and are routinely included by polling companies.

Individual polls

Poll results are listed in the table below in reverse chronological order. The highest percentage figure in each polling survey is displayed in bold, and the background shaded in the leading party's colour. The 'party lead' column shows the percentage-point difference between the two parties with the highest figures. In the instance of a tie, both figures are shaded and displayed in bold. Percentages may not add to 100 percent due to polls not reporting figures for all minor parties and due to rounding. Refusals are generally excluded from the party vote percentages, while question wording and the treatment of "don't know" responses and those not intending to vote may vary between survey organisations.

The parties shown in the table are National (NAT), Labour (LAB), New Zealand First (NZF), Green (GRN), ACT, Opportunities (TOP), Māori (MRI), New Conservative (NCP) and Advance New Zealand (ANZ). Other parties have also registered in some polls, but are not listed in this table.

UMR and Curia polls
These polls are typically unpublished and are used internally for Labour (UMR) and National (Curia). Although these polls are sometimes leaked or partially leaked, their details are not publicly available for viewing and scrutinising. Because not all of their polls are made public, it is likely that those that are released are cherry-picked and therefore may not truly indicate ongoing trends.

Preferred prime minister
Some opinion pollsters ask voters who they would prefer as prime minister. The phrasing of questions and the treatment of refusals, as well as "don't know" answers, differ from poll to poll.

Government approval rating

Electorate polling

Auckland Central

East Coast

Northland

Hauraki-Waikato

Ikaroa-Rāwhiti

Tāmaki Makaurau

Te Tai Hauāuru

Te Tai Tokerau

Te Tai Tonga

Waiariki

Forecasts

See also 
Opinion polling for the next New Zealand general election
2017 New Zealand general election
Opinion polling for the 2017 New Zealand general election
Politics of New Zealand

Notes

References

2020 New Zealand general election